The 2019–20 Syed Mushtaq Ali Trophy was the eleventh season of the Syed Mushtaq Ali Trophy, a Twenty20 cricket tournament in India. It was contested by 38 teams, divided into five groups, with eight teams in Group C. The group stage started on 8 November 2019. The top two teams from Group C progressed  to the Super League section of the competition. Following the conclusion of matches played on 17 November 2019, six of the eight teams in Group C were level on points, all on 16 points each. After the final day of group stage matches, Maharashtra and Punjab had progressed to the Super League stage of the tournament.

Points table

Fixtures

Round 1

Round 2

Round 3

Round 4

Round 5

Round 6

Round 7

References

Syed Mushtaq Ali Trophy
Syed Mushtaq Ali Trophy
Syed Mushtaq Ali